Photoplay was one of the first American film (another name for photoplay) fan magazines. It was founded in 1911 in Chicago, the same year that J. Stuart Blackton founded Motion Picture Story, a magazine also directed at fans. For most of its run, Photoplay was published by Macfadden Publications. In 1921 Photoplay established what is considered the first significant annual movie award. The magazine ceased publication in 1980.

History
Photoplay began as a short fiction magazine concerned mostly with the plots and characters of films at the time and was used as a promotional tool for those films. In 1915, Julian Johnson and James R. Quirk became the editors (though Quirk had been vice president of the magazine since its inception), and together they created a format which would set a precedent for almost all celebrity magazines that followed. By 1918 the circulation exceeded 200,000, with the popularity of the magazine fueled by the public's increasing interest in the private lives of celebrities.

Popularity

Photoplay reached its apex in the 1920s and 1930s and was considered quite influential within the motion picture industry. The magazine was renowned for its artwork portraits of film stars on the cover by such artists as Earl Christy and Charles Sheldon. Macfadden Publications purchased the magazine in 1934. With the advancement of color photography, the magazine began using photographs of the stars instead by 1937.

Photoplay published the writings of Lillian Day, Sheilah Graham, Hedda Hopper, Dorothy Kilgallen, Hazel MacDonald, Louella Parsons, Adela Rogers St. Johns, Rob Wagner, later editor and publisher of Rob Wagner's Script, and Walter Winchell, among others. The magazine was edited by Quirk until 1932; later editors include Kathryn Dougherty, Ruth Waterbury, and Adele Whiteley Fletcher. It also featured the health and beauty advice of Sylvia of Hollywood, arguably the first fitness guru to the stars.

Sidney Skolsky, a nationally syndicated gossip columnist for the New York Daily News and later the New York Daily Mirror, had a regular column in Photoplay called "From A Stool At Schwab’s", the Hollywood drugstore he made famous; such was the magazine's popularity.

The Photoplay Magazine Medal of Honor

In 1921 Photoplay established what is considered the first significant annual movie award, the Photoplay Magazine Medal of Honor. An actual medallion produced by Tiffany & Co., it was voted on by the readers of the magazine and given to the producer of the year's best film, chosen with an emphasis on (according to Quirk) "the ideals and motives governing its production... the worth of its dramatic message." Though Photoplay only gave the single award for best film, its intentions and standards were influential on the Academy Awards founded later in the decade, and they overlap on Best Picture choices to some extent, though increasingly in the 1930s Photoplay'''s choices reflected its primarily female audience. By 1939 the Medal of Honor had declined in importance and the award was discontinued that year.

From 1944 to 1968, Photoplay awarded a Gold Medal for film of the year based on polling done by George Gallup's Audience Research Inc. through the 1950s, and then voted on by the magazine's readers. It also awarded Most Popular Male Star and Most Popular Female Star based on an actor and actress' popularity, not their performance. The awards were based on polling through the 1950s, and then on a vote by the readers, similar to the Gold Medal. Bing Crosby and Greer Garson were frequently named the most popular film stars during the 1940s and later winners of the title included James Stewart, Jane Wyman, Alan Ladd, Marilyn Monroe, Rock Hudson, and Kim Novak. Most popular television stars were also named in the 1960s. In 1948, the Photoplay Awards were broadcast on network television as part of The Steve Allen Plymouth Show.

Medal of Honor winners: 1920–1939

 1920: Humoresque 1921: Tol'able David 1922: Robin Hood 1923: The Covered Wagon 1924: The Dramatic Life of Abraham Lincoln 
 1925: The Big Parade 1926: Beau Geste 1927: Seventh Heaven 1928: Four Sons 1929: Disraeli 1930: All Quiet on the Western Front 1931: Cimarron 1932: Smilin' Through 1933: Little Women 1934: The Barretts of Wimpole Street 1935: Naughty Marietta 1936: San Francisco 1937: Captains Courageous 1938: Sweethearts 1939: Gone with the WindGold Medal Winners for film of the year: 1944–1968

 1944: Going My Way 1945: The Valley of Decision 1946: The Bells of St. Mary's 1947: The Jolson Story 1948: Sitting Pretty 1949: The Stratton Story 1950: Battleground 1951: Show Boat 1952: With a Song in My Heart 1953: From Here to Eternity 1954: Magnificent Obsession 1955: Love is a Many-Splendored Thing 1956: Giant 1957: An Affair to Remember 1958: Gigi 1959: Pillow Talk 1960: no awards
 1961: Splendor in the Grass 1962: The Miracle Worker 1963: How the West Was Won 1964: The Unsinkable Molly Brown 1965: The Sound of Music 1966: The Russians Are Coming, the Russians Are Coming 1967: The Dirty Dozen 1968: Rosemary's Baby Mergers and closure Photoplay merged with another fan magazine, Movie Mirror, in 1941; and with TV-Radio Mirror in 1977, when the name became Photoplay and TV Mirror.

The magazine published its final issue on April 15, 1980. In a sign of changing times, the cover photo featured not movie stars but two television actresses, Victoria Principal and Charlene Tilton. The skeleton staff of six people were all transferred to Us magazine, which Macfadden Publications had recently acquired. The president of Macfadden, Peter J. Callahan, said the decision to cease publication was made "very reluctantly", but also added the bald observation that "the day of the traditional movie magazine is over".

A British version of Photoplay debuted in March 1950, and in April 1981 it was rebranded as Photoplay: Movies and Video''. It featured an equal mix of American and British films and stars, and ceased publication in 1989.

References

External links

 Original Photoplay interview with Greta Garbo - as told by her to Ruth Biery

Film magazines published in the United States
Defunct magazines published in the United States
Fiction magazines
Magazines disestablished in 1980
Magazines established in 1911
Magazines published in Chicago